A referendum on a law on public sector pensions was held in Liechtenstein on 15 June 2014.

Results

Preference voting
Some voters voted yes to both options, but highlighted a preference for one of them.

References

2014 in Liechtenstein
2014 referendums
2014
Pension referendums
June 2014 events in Europe